Shaikh Abdul Majeed Sindhi (7 July 1889 – 24 May 1978) a famous writer, politician, journalist of Sindh.

Education
Shaikh Abdul Majeed Sindhi matriculated (completed 10th Grade in school) (Sindhi: ست درجه فائنل) from Thatta, Sindh in British India.

Conversion to Islam

He born in a Hindu family in Thatta. Since childhood he was in the search of mystic approach and in this regard on 10 February 1908, he converted to Islam on the hands of Shaikh Abdul Rahim at Hyderabad, Sindh.

Professional career
Shaikh Abdul Majeed Sindhi became Munshi at a senior advocate Mr. Deechand Ojha. Afterwards he lived at Hyderabad where Rais Ghulam Muhammad Khan Bhurgri made him editor of his own newspaper Al Amen . Having been inspired from his intellect Bhurgri made him his political adviser.

Political career
He was an active participant of Silk Letter Movement (Reshmi Rumal Tahrik), by Molana Ubeduallah Sindhi, in which he was imprisoned in 1919 for three years. Later, he addressed a campaign against the British Raj in a procession in 1920 at Larkana and was again imprisoned for two years. In 1924, he became editor of Daily Al Waheed, Sindh's only daily newspaper at the time. Through this platform, he incited the Muslim population. On 16 November 1929, he participated in All-India Muslim League session at Allahabad, All India Khilafat Conference at Ajmer, All Parties Muslim Unity Conference and Azad Sindh Conference at Karachi (1930). His efforts for the separation of Sindh from Bombay were to be cherished. Sindh was separated from Bombay in 1936, he took part in the first election of Sindh Assembly (1937) from his own party and defeating Sir Shahnawaz, he became member of the Sindh assembly. In 1940, under the ministry of Mir Bunda Ali Khan, he was made a Minister in Sindh. In 1943, he left Muslim League and joined All Pakistan Awami Tahreek which was led by Khan Abdul Ghaffar Khan in 1949.

Publications
Shaikh Abdul Majeed Sindhi had written some books, which are: Fathe Spain, Hazrat Umer Bin Abdul Aziz (R.A)  
Karachi Sindh Khe Milan Ghurje, All Murtaza, Tareekh Jawahir, Hazrat Ali & Hazrat Umer (R.A)

Death
Shaikh Abdul Majeed Sindhi died 24 May 1978 at Hyderabad, Sindh and was buried at historical Graveyard Makli near the grave of writer Makhdoom Mohammad Hashim Thatvi according to his will.

References

1889 births
1978 deaths
Pakistani male journalists
Pakistani male writers
Pakistani politicians
Pakistani Muslims